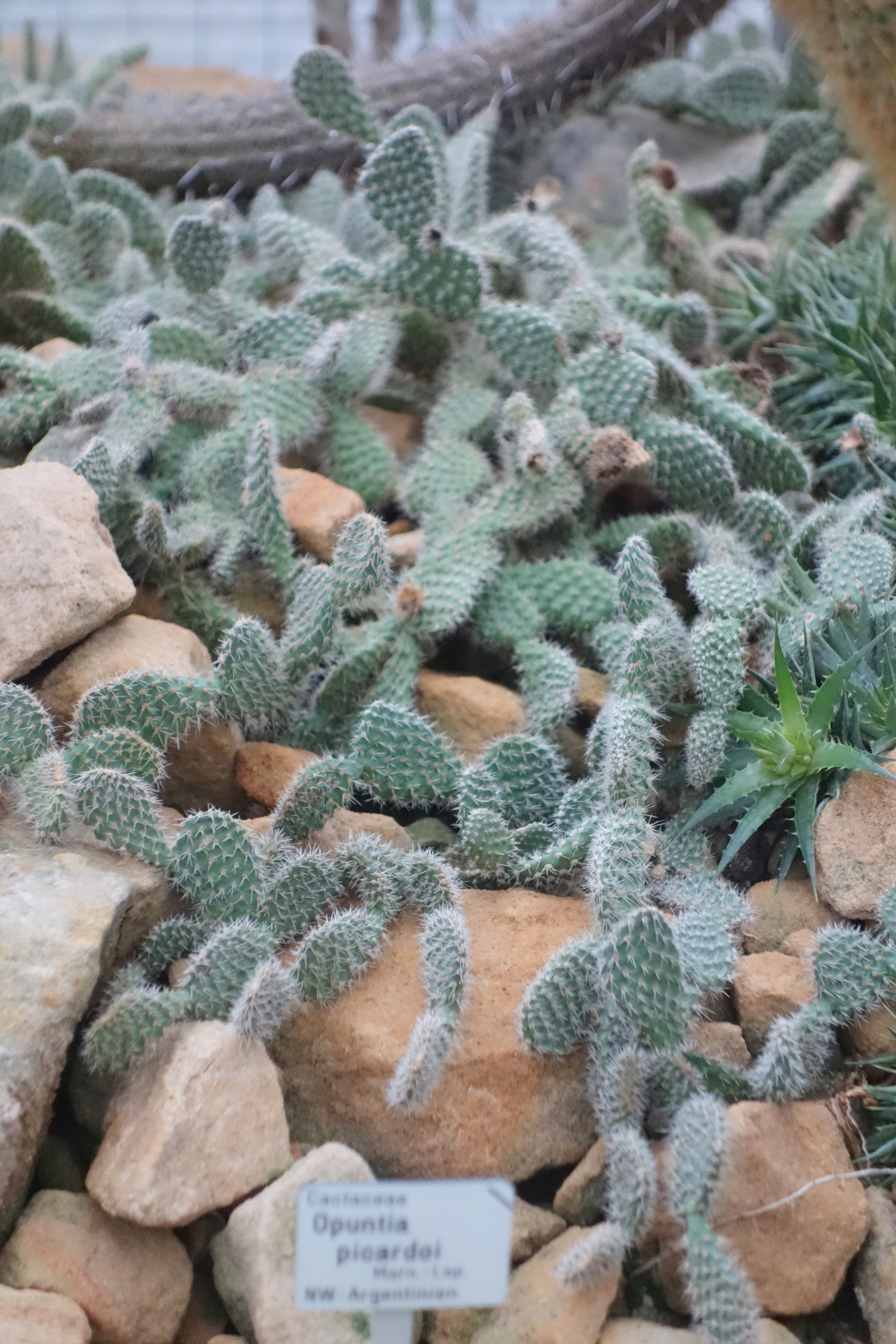

Scientific classification
- Kingdom: Plantae
- Clade: Tracheophytes
- Clade: Angiosperms
- Clade: Eudicots
- Order: Caryophyllales
- Family: Cactaceae
- Genus: Opuntia
- Species: O. picardoi

Binomial name
- Opuntia picardoi Marn.-Lap.

Synonyms
- Airampoa picardoi (Marn.-Lap.) Doweld

= Opuntia picardoi =

Species of cactus

Opuntia picardoi is a species of cactus.
